The 2011 Challengers League was the fifth season of amateur K3 League. In this season, the K3 League was renamed the "Challengers League", and 16 clubs participated after Samcheok Shinwoo Electronics and Yongin Citizen withdrew from the league. The participating clubs were divided into two groups, and the winners and runners-up of both groups qualified for the championship playoffs. All clubs had interleague play once after playing home and away season in each group.

Regular season

Group A

Group B

Championship playoffs

Bracket

Semi-finals

Final

Gyeongju Citizen won 4–3 on aggregate.

Final table

See also
2011 in South Korean football
2011 Challengers Cup
2011 Korean FA Cup

References

External links

K3 League (2007–2019) seasons
2011 in South Korean football